Dennis Mark Bristow is a South African businessman, the President and CEO at Barrick Gold Corporation. He was previously the Founder and CEO at Randgold Resources, which was purchased by Barrick in 2018.

Early life
Born in Estcourt, South Africa, Bristow attended Estcourt High School and then graduated from the University of Natal with BSc and PhD degrees in geology. In the 1970s, he served as an officer in the South African Army and saw active service against guerrillas in Swaziland and Angola.

Career
Bristow joined Rand Mines in 1981 and then became head of exploration at Randgold & Exploration. In 1995 he created Randgold Resources and listed it on the London Stock Exchange in 1997. In 2018, Barrick agreed to buy Randgold in an all-stock deal for US$6.5 billion, creating the world's largest gold producer.

Personal life
He is married with two sons, and has homes in London, the United States, South Africa, and Mauritius.

References

1959 births
Living people
People from Inkosi Langalibalele Local Municipality
White South African people
South African businesspeople
South African geologists
South African chief executives
South African corporate directors
South African Army officers
South African military personnel of the Border War
University of Natal alumni
20th-century South African businesspeople
21st-century South African businesspeople